The Association of Malayalam Movie Artists, abbreviated as AMMA, is an Indian organisation of film actors and actresses working in the Malayalam cinema, formed in 1994.

Governing body 

The governing body serves for three years. It includes a President, two Vice-presidents, General Secretary, Joint Secretary, Treasurer and other Executive Committee members. Only members with Life Membership status can  become a member of the Governing body.

The office-bearers for 2021–2024 are:

President: Mohanlal
Vice-Presidents: Shwetha Menon and Maniyanpilla Raju
General Secretary: Edavela Babu
Joint Secretary: Jayasurya
Treasurer: Siddique
Executive Committee members: Sudheer Karamana, Surabhi Lakshmi, Baburaj, Tovino Thomas, Manju Pillai, Tini Tom, Unni Mukundan, Lena, Rachana Narayanankutty and Lal.

Public contributions 
 The association contributed  lakh to the Chief Minister's Distress Relief Fund, to extend its support during the 2018 Kerala floods.
 The AMMA along with Asianet conducted a stage show in Abu Dhabi in December 2018 to raise  crore for the Chief Minister's Distress Relief Fund.

Disputes 
 In February 2010, Thilakan announced that members within AMMA had conspired and denied him work. The executive members of AMMA convened multiple meetings to hear his complaints. Since Thilakan did not attend those meetings and continued to publicly defame the association, he was expelled. After Thilakan died, his son Shammi Thilakan, a member of AMMA, requested the AMMA leadership to reconsider and reinstate his father's membership posthumously.
 In March 2017, based on the petition by director Vinayan in 2012, Competition Commission of India (CCI), imposed a total fine of  Lakhs on the AMMA and Film Employees Federation Of Kerala (FEFKA) for denying opportunities for Vinayan, preventing artists from co-operating with Vinayan, and rejecting his films from theaters.
 In 2017, actor Dileep was removed from AMMA's primary membership after he was charged and arrested for criminal conspiracy in a criminal assault case. He was expelled from actors' guild and lost his primary membership in AMMA.
When Dileep was released on bail, his membership was reinstated by AMMA, claiming his removal was not legally valid as per the laws of the committee. The claim was primarily made by K. B. Ganesh Kumar.

Protesting the lukewarm approach in expelling Dileep, few actresses protested and resigned from AMMA membership. They formed a group named Women in Cinema Collective (WCC). WCC protested through a series of social media interventions that AMMA should take a favorable stand towards the welfare of the female actors in Malayalam cinema. In light of these events, AMMA General body meeting conducted in 2021 revised its bylaws; including more women in the executive body; and established an internal complaints committee for the welfare of women.

References

External links
 Official Website

Actors' trade unions
Film organisations in India
Entertainment industry unions